A story environment is a physical, adaptive, augmented 3D reality or virtual space that can become host to narratives. Distinct from a story world, these environments can be in close proximity and even overlapping, and may have quite different narrative themes. The stories may be heavily scripted, or be created and shared by the space's users.

A story environment has potentially five levels:

Level 1 - Shared
Inhabitants create their own stories and shared mythology in a non specific narrative space.
Level 2 - Seeded
Catalyst writer/actor role plays and brings others into their story world in a generic narrative space
Level 3 - Influenced
Static - The environment is rich but only communicates in a visual static way
Living - The environment speaks to the participant, a monologue, pushes story at the participant e.g.; ghosts, residual lives, placed signage etc.:
Dynamic - The participant has a dialogue with the environment which responds to most things they do. E.g.: objects and bots respond to chat
Level 4 - Character
Environments that are richly rendered with strong back-stories and require the participant to improvise around a range character definitions with others who are also role playing. 
Improvised - human
Non-player characters are key role players

Level 5 - Scripted
The most passive where the participant inhabits a scripted part using two methods depending on the technology 
Automatically animating the participant and talking for the participant with others (automated) in group scenes
The participant delivers a pre-set script as actor

External links
Laboratory for Advanced Media Production Definitions
IBM Physically Interactive Story Environments
Hamlet on the Holodeck

Interactive fiction